The 1897 Minor Counties Championship was the third running of the Minor Counties Cricket Championship, and ran from 7 June to 28 August 1897. Having been unbeaten for the entire season, Worcestershire won their second consecutive outright title, having also shared the title in 1895. Staffordshire were level in the table with Worcestershire, but played an insufficient number of matches to be considered co-champions. Sixteen teams competed in the championship, with Cornwall, Dorset and Monmouthshire all competing for the first time, though none of them played the minimum of eight matches.

The leading run-scorer, Arthur Croome of Berkshire, also had the highest individual score of the season, 158 against Hertfordshire. The leading wicket-taker for the second consecutive season, Buckinghamshire's George Nash, took three ten wicket match hauls, including 16/74 against Oxfordshire.

Table
 One point was awarded for a win, and one point was taken away for each loss. Final placings were decided by dividing the number of points earned by the number of completed matches (i.e. those that ended in a win or a loss), and multiplying by 100.

Notes
  denotes the Champion team(s).
  denotes a team that failed to play the minimum of eight matches. These teams are sometimes omitted from the table altogether.

Averages

References

External links
Minor Counties Championship 1897 at CricketArchive

1897 in English cricket
English cricket seasons in the 19th century
1897